John James Uy is a Filipino-American, artist, host and model.

Biography

John James Uy was born on September 13, 1987 in Mountain View California. In 2007, he won 2nd runner-up in the Be Bench / The Model Search.  A year after, he was picked to do hosting jobs for myx North America/Myx International. In the same year, he starred in his first regular TV stint in Pieta.

Filmography

Television

Films

Notes

References

Living people
Filipino male models
Filipino male television actors
Reality modeling competition participants
Star Magic
Viva Artists Agency
1987 births
21st-century Filipino male actors
Participants in Philippine reality television series